Philosophy and Conceptual Art is a 2007 book edited by Elisabeth Schellekens and Peter Goldie. The contributors deal with the philosophical questions raised by conceptual art.

Contributors
 Margaret Boden
 Diarmuid Costello
 Gregory Currie 
 David Davies
 Peter Goldie
 Robert Hopkins
 Matthew Kieran
 Peter Lamarque
 Dominic McIver Lopes
 Derek Matravers
 Elisabeth Schellekens
 Kathleen Stock
 Carolyn Wilde
 Art & Language group

References

External links
Philosophy and Conceptual Art

2007 non-fiction books
Aesthetics books
Oxford University Press books
Edited volumes
Conceptual art